A286 is a Brazilian rap group, formed in 1997. They released their first album in 2007, entitled Além do Crime e da Razão.

Discography

Studio albums
 1997 – Além do Crime e da Razão
 2010 – Exército dos Excluídos

History 
In 2007, the A286 has released his first album, Além do Crime e da Razão, produced by Erick 12. The album contains 16 tracks.

In 2010, the A286 has the production of the second album signed by Erick 12, who is also the group's DJ. Army of the Excluded, is a heavy rap record, reporting problems faced in the periphery, such as crime, drugs and violence policeman.

References 

Brazilian hip hop groups
Musical groups from São Paulo
Musical groups established in 1997
1997 establishments in Brazil